Whiteshill is a village in the Cotswolds, situated between Stroud and Gloucester, in Gloucestershire, England and forms part of the Stroud urban area. The parish of Whiteshill and Ruscombe has a population of 1,175.

The Church of England Church is St. Paul's. When the limits of Stroud parish were set in 1304, Whiteshill and Ruscombe formed part of the tithing of Paganhill. They remained part of Stroud until 1894, when the new civil parish of Whiteshill was created.

References

External links

Villages in Gloucestershire
Stroud District